Retardant may refer to:
Fire retardant
Flame retardant